The 2002–03 Zamalek SC season was the club's 92nd season in existence and the 44th consecutive season in the top flight of Egyptian football. In addition to the domestic league, Zamalek participated in this season's editions of the Egypt Cup, the Arab Unified Club Championship, the Egyptian Super Cup and the CAF Champions League.

Pre-season and friendlies

Competitions

Overall record

Egyptian Premier League

League table

Results summary

Results by round

Matches

Egypt Cup

CAF Champions League

Group stage

Arab Unified Club Championship

Group stage 
The draw for the group stage was held on 6 June 2003.

Knockout stage

References

Zamalek SC seasons
Zamalek